Glaucocharis sericophthalma is a moth in the family Crambidae. It was described by Edward Meyrick in 1933. It is found in Fiji.

References

Diptychophorini
Moths described in 1933